This is a list of notable Sri Lankan American citizens, including both original immigrants who obtained American citizenship and their American descendants, but does not include Sri Lankan nationals living or working in the U.S. The list includes a brief description of the reason for their notability.

Academics
 Rohan Abeyaratne - academic and engineer
 Athula Attygalle - professor in mass spectrometry
 Ananda Coomaraswamy - philosopher
 Sarath Gunapala - solid-state physicist, senior research scientist and group supervisor at NASA's Jet Propulsion Laboratory
 Shelton Gunaratne - Professor Emeritus of Mass Communications at Minnesota State University Moorhead
 Ratnajeevan Hoole - professor in Electrical and Computer Engineering at Michigan State University
 Curuppumullage Jinarajadasa - freemason, theosophist and president of the Theosophical Society Adyar
 Nalin Kulatilaka - Professor of Finance at School of Management
 Patrick Mendis - educator, diplomat, author, and executive in US government service
 Anura C. Perera - science writer, astronomer
 Nalin Samarasinha - astronomer, first Sri Lankan to have an asteroid named after him
 Stanley Jeyaraja Tambiah - Esther and Sidney Rabb Professor of Anthropology, Emeritus, Harvard University
 Siva Sivananthan - professor, scientist and Director of the Microphysics Laboratory at the University of Illinois
 Sam Weerahandi - former professor; the first ASA Fellow of Sri Lankan origin

Actors
 Sanjit De Silva - actor, known for roles in The Company Men and American Desi
 Fabianne Therese - actor

Architecture
 Raj Barr-Kumar - fellow and past president of the AIA

Artists 
 Anne Cherubim - Painter

Business
 Namal Nawana - CEO of Smith & Nephew
 Raj Fernando - chairman and CEO of Scoutahead.com and philanthropist
 Sanjay Kumar - businessman
 Kumar Mahadeva - entrepreneur and CEO
 Chamath Palihapitiya - venture capitalist, software developer
 Raj Rajaratnam - founder of Galleon Group, a New York-based hedge fund management firm, convicted of insider trading

Film
 Thushari Jayasekera - actress, writer, emcee, and performance artist; with her role on NBC's  Outsourced (2010-2011), she is the first American actress of Sri Lankan origin to play a principal role in a primetime show on a major American TV network
 Chandran Rutnam - film director, producer, screenwriter
 Fabianne Therese - actress, director
 Bernard White - actor, screenwriter, film director
 Gina Zamparelli - Los Angeles-based concert promoter; daughter of Maureen Hingert

Medical
 Bandula Wijay -  inventor, businessman, and diplomat. Invented "Nested Loop" vascular stent.

Military
 John Kingsman Beling - Rear Admiral of the United States Navy

Musicians 
 DeLon - rapper and record producer; first Sri Lankan-American to appear on the Billboard charts
 Clarence Jey - US Billboard and Grammy-credited record producer and songwriter
 Ranidu Lankage - rapper
 Ruwanga Samath - record producer and the president of The Bird Call Productions

Politicians
 Basil Rajapaksa - Member of the Sri Lankan Parliament
 Gotabaya Rajapaksa - 8th President of the  Democratic Socialist Republic of Sri Lanka

Rebels
 Visvanathan Rudrakumaran - Chairman of the Provisional Transnational Government of Tamil Eelam, a pro-LTTE (Liberation Tigers of Tamil Ealam) front organization (LTTE has been described as a terrorist organization by the US, European Union and many other countries)

Religion
 Bawa Muhaiyaddeen - teacher and Sufi mystic
 Witiyala Seewalie Thera - founder/President and abbot of the Minnesota Buddhist Vihara; recently appointed Deputy Chief Sangha Nayaka of North America

Singers
 Danielle de Niese - opera singer
 Sean Panikkar - opera singer
 Tharanga Goonetilleke - opera singer

Sports
 Nagalingam Ethirveerasingam - Olympian for 1952 and 1956 Olympic Games
 Barney Henricus - 1938 British Empire Games boxing gold medallist
 Christine Sonali Merrill - Olympian in 2012; engineer
 Roy Silva - cricketer who has represented the US in Twenty20 International
 Sunil Weeramantry - chess trainer, author

Writers
 Indran Amirthanayagam - author
 V. V. Ganeshananthan - fiction writer, essayist, and journalist
 Patrick Mendis - educator, diplomat, author, and executive in US government service
 Mary Anne Mohanraj - speculative fiction writer and editor who helped found Strange Horizons
 Nayomi Munaweera - author
 Leah Lakshmi Piepzna-Samarasinha - poet, writer, educator, social activist
 Romesh Ratnesar - journalist and author
 Rosemary Rogers - best-selling author of romance novels in the US; has been on the New York Times best-sellers list
 Sunil Yapa - fiction writer, author of Your Heart Is a Muscle The Size of a Fist (2016), which he promoted as a guest on Late Night with Seth Meyers

Others
 Rifqa Bary
 Natalie and Nadiya Anderson - twin sisters who had competed in The Amazing Race and Survivor
 Upeshka - professional poker player

See also
 List of Sri Lankans

References

Sri Lankans

American
Sri Lankan
Sri Lankan